Camp Wooten Retreat Center (formerly Camp Wooten Environmental Learning Center) is a group camp in the Washington State Park System located fifteen miles south of Pomeroy in Columbia County, Washington. It consists of a 1930s-era dining hall and many cabins and other facilities on the Tucannon River and Donnie Lake in the Blue Mountains. Available activities include indoor swimming, canoeing on the lake, hiking, archery and other athletic facilities.

References

External links
Camp Wooten Retreat Center Washington State Parks and Recreation Commission

State parks of Washington (state)
Parks in Columbia County, Washington
Buildings and structures in Columbia County, Washington
Civilian Conservation Corps in Washington (state)